The 1809 Epsom Derby was a horse race which took place at Epsom Downs on  18 May 1809. It was the 29th running of the Derby, and it was won by Pope. The winner was ridden by Tom Goodisson and trained by Robert Robson.

Race details
 Number of runners: 10

Full result

Note: Finishing position of 0 here indicates also ran, but finished lower than 6th

* The distances between the horses are shown in lengths or shorter. shd = short-head; hd = head; PU = pulled up.

Winner's details
Further details of the winner, Pope:

 Foaled: 1806
 Sire: Waxy; Dam: Prunella (by Highflyer)
 Owner: 3rd Duke of Grafton
 Breeder: 3rd Duke of Grafton

References

 Race Report - Sporting magazine

Epsom Derby
 1809
1809 in English sport
19th century in Surrey